The WWE Championship is a world heavyweight championship created and promoted by the American professional wrestling promotion WWE, representing the Raw brand division. It is one of two world titles on WWE's main roster, alongside SmackDown's Universal Championship. The current champion is Roman Reigns, who is in his fourth reign. As Reigns concurrently holds the Universal Championship, he presently defends the titles together across both brands as the Undisputed WWE Universal Championship, although both titles retain their individual lineages.

The original world championship of the promotion, it was established by the then-World Wide Wrestling Federation (WWWF) on April 25, 1963, as the WWWF World Heavyweight Championship, after the promotion seceded from the National Wrestling Alliance (NWA). The inaugural champion was Buddy Rogers. Since its inception, the title has undergone many name changes due to company name changes and title unifications. It is the oldest championship currently active in WWE, and is presented as being the promotion's most prestigious title, with many matches for the title having headlined pay-per-view and livestreaming events – including WWE's flagship event WrestleMania. In professional wrestling in general, it is considered to be one of the most prestigious championships of all time.

From its inception until 2001, it was promoted as WWE's sole primary championship. An additional world title, the WCW Championship, was added after the then-World Wrestling Federation's purchase of World Championship Wrestling in early 2001. The titles were later unified as the Undisputed Championship. After the first brand split in 2002 and the promotion being renamed to WWE, the championship became exclusive to SmackDown, and the World Heavyweight Championship was created for Raw. ECW became a third brand in 2006, adding the ECW Championship. That title was deactivated in 2010, and the World Heavyweight Championship was unified into the WWE Championship in 2013. The championship was again the sole world title of WWE until the introduction of the Universal Championship with the 2016 brand split. During both brand splits, the WWE Championship has switched brands, usually as a result of the WWE Draft; in 2019, the title was moved to Raw.

History

Origin 

The title was introduced in 1963 with Buddy Rogers becoming the first champion. However, its origin is attributed to events that began in the National Wrestling Alliance (NWA), which had various territorial member promotions. In the 1950s, Capitol Wrestling Corporation (CWC) was a member of the NWA and by 1963, its executives held a controlling stake over NWA operations. During this time, Buddy Rogers held the NWA World Heavyweight Championship until January 24, when Lou Thesz defeated Rogers for the championship in a one-fall match. Claiming the title can only be contested in a traditional two-out-of-three falls match, the promotion disputed the title change, and thus seceded from the NWA and became the World Wide Wrestling Federation (WWWF). The WWWF World Heavyweight Championship was then established and awarded to Buddy Rogers with the explanation that he won a fictional tournament in Rio de Janeiro, supposedly defeating Antonino Rocca in the finals. After several years, the WWWF became affiliated with the NWA once again, and "World" was dropped from the championship's name. In 1979, the WWWF was renamed World Wrestling Federation (WWF), and then after conclusively ending its affiliation with the NWA in 1983, the championship became known as the WWF World Heavyweight Championship. Although the full name appeared on the championship belts until 1998, the name was often abbreviated to WWF Championship, which became its official name in 1998.

Monday Night Wars and title unification 

In 1991, World Championship Wrestling (WCW), a member of the NWA, established the WCW World Heavyweight Championship to replace the NWA's world title. In 1993, WCW seceded from the NWA and grew to become a rival promotion to the WWF. Both organizations grew into mainstream prominence and were eventually involved in a television ratings war, dubbed the Monday Night Wars. Near the end of the ratings war, WCW began a financial decline, which culminated in WWF purchasing WCW in March 2001. As a result of the purchase, the WWF acquired, among other assets, WCW's championships. Thus, there were two world titles in the WWF: the original WWF Championship and the WCW Championship, which was eventually renamed the "World Championship".

In December 2001, the two championships were unified at Vengeance. At the event, Stone Cold Steve Austin defeated Kurt Angle to retain the WWF Championship, while Chris Jericho defeated The Rock for the World Championship. After this, Jericho then defeated Austin, unifying the WWF and World Championships, and becoming the first Undisputed WWF Champion; the Undisputed championship retained the lineage of the WWF Championship and the World Championship was retired. Subsequently, the Big Eagle Belt (formerly representing the WWF Championship) and the Big Gold Belt (formerly representing the World Championship) were used in tandem to represent the Undisputed Championship. Jericho held the championship for four months until he lost it at WrestleMania X8 against Triple H, who was soon after presented with a single championship belt.

Championship disputes 

The Undisputed Championship continued up through the beginning of the first brand split, which saw wrestlers being drafted to the company's main television programs, Raw and SmackDown, each show representing the brand of the same name, with championships assigned to and authority figures appointed for each brand. The holder of the Undisputed Championship was the only male wrestler allowed to appear on both shows.

In May 2002, the WWF was renamed World Wrestling Entertainment (WWE) and the championships were renamed accordingly. At first, the championship remained unaffiliated with either brand as wrestlers from both brands could challenge the champion. Following the appointment of Eric Bischoff and Stephanie McMahon as General Managers of Raw and SmackDown, respectively, Stephanie McMahon convinced then-Undisputed Champion Brock Lesnar to become exclusive to the SmackDown brand, leaving the Raw brand without a world title. In response, on September 2, Bischoff disputed Lesnar's status as champion, stating Lesnar was refusing to defend his title against the designated No. 1 contender, Triple H, and awarded the latter with the newly created World Heavyweight Championship. Immediately afterwards, Lesnar's championship dropped the epithet "Undisputed" and became known as the WWE Championship.

Over the course of the first brand split, the WWE Championship was used as the world title of the SmackDown brand twice and of the Raw brand three times. In all but two cases, the WWE Championship switched brands as a result of the annual draft. In June 2006, WWE established ECW as a third brand, on which former Extreme Championship Wrestling stars and newer talent competed. When ECW's Rob Van Dam won the WWE Championship at ECW One Night Stand on June 11, 2006, the championship briefly became a world title of the ECW brand; the ECW World Heavyweight Championship was subsequently reactivated for the ECW brand upon Van Dam's title win. Van Dam held both titles until he lost the WWE Championship to Raw's Edge the following month. The ECW brand was disbanded in 2010, subsequently deactivating the ECW Championship. In April 2011, WWE ceased going by its full name with the "WWE" abbreviation becoming an orphaned initialism, and the first brand split ended that August.

Just prior to the end of the first brand split, a storyline saw CM Punk vowing to leave the company with the WWE Championship when his contract expired on July 17, 2011, the date of the 2011 Money in the Bank pay-per-view. At the event, Punk succeeded in defeating the defending champion John Cena to win the title, and left the company with the physical championship belt. Subsequently, the championship was vacated and Rey Mysterio won an eight-man tournament by defeating The Miz in the finals to be crowned the new WWE Champion, only to subsequently lose it later that night to Cena, for the latter's record ninth reign. However, following Cena's win, Punk returned to WWE with his own championship belt, disputing Cena's claim to the title. The two WWE Champions wrestled each other at SummerSlam; Punk defeated Cena to solidify his claim on the title.

Title reunified and second brand split 

Following the end of the first brand split in August 2011, both the WWE Champion and World Heavyweight Champion could appear on both Raw and SmackDown. In November 2013, the night after Survivor Series, reigning World Heavyweight Champion John Cena made a challenge to reigning WWE Champion Randy Orton to determine WWE's undisputed world champion. Orton defeated Cena in a TLC match at the TLC: Tables, Ladders & Chairs pay-per-view on December 15, 2013, to unify the titles. Subsequently, the unified championship was renamed WWE World Heavyweight Championship and retained the lineage of the WWE Championship; the World Heavyweight Championship was retired. Orton and subsequent champions held both championship belts until a single championship belt was given to reigning champion Brock Lesnar in August 2014.

After Dean Ambrose became champion in June 2016, the title's name was reverted to WWE Championship. In light of the return of the brand split the following month, Ambrose was drafted to SmackDown. Ambrose then retained his title at Battleground on July 24 against Raw draftees Seth Rollins and Roman Reigns, making the title exclusive to SmackDown. On the July 25 episode of Raw, to address the lack of a world title for the brand, the WWE Universal Championship was created; Finn Bálor became the inaugural champion at SummerSlam. After the unveiling of the Universal title, the WWE Championship was renamed WWE World Championship, but reverted to WWE Championship in December 2016 during AJ Styles' first reign.

The title changed hands for the first time outside of North America when AJ Styles defeated Jinder Mahal to win his second WWE Championship in Manchester, England on the November 7, 2017, episode of SmackDown. This was also the first time in nearly 15 years that the championship changed hands on an episode of SmackDown; the last time was in 2003 when Brock Lesnar defeated Kurt Angle for the title.

At Crown Jewel on October 31, 2019, SmackDown wrestler "The Fiend" Bray Wyatt won the Universal Championship, thus transferring the title to SmackDown. Also at that event, after reigning WWE Champion Brock Lesnar had defeated Cain Velasquez to retain the title, he was attacked by Raw's Rey Mysterio, who Lesnar had attacked a few weeks prior. The following night on Friday Night SmackDown, Lesnar quit SmackDown and went to Raw to continue his feud with Mysterio, thus transferring the WWE Championship to Raw.

At WrestleMania 38 Night 2 on April 3, 2022, SmackDown's Universal Champion Roman Reigns defeated reigning WWE Champion Brock Lesnar in a Winner Takes All match to claim both championships and become recognized as the Undisputed WWE Universal Champion. WWE had billed the match as a championship unification match; however, both titles remain independently active with Reigns being a double champion, defending both titles together across both brands as the Undisputed WWE Universal Championship.

Brand designation 
With the first brand split, an annual draft was established in 2002. Each year (except 2003), the General Managers participated in a draft lottery in which select members of WWE's roster were assigned to a brand. The revived ECW became a third brand from 2006 to 2010. On August 29, 2011, WWE ended the brand extension and wrestlers (including all champions), were then free to appear on any program.

On July 19, 2016, SmackDown moved to Tuesdays and became a live show with its own set of wrestlers and writers, separate from Raw, thus reintroducing the brand split. The draft took place on the live premiere of SmackDown. On the July 18 episode of Raw, SmackDown Commissioner Shane McMahon named Daniel Bryan the SmackDown General Manager and Raw Commissioner Stephanie McMahon named Mick Foley the Raw General Manager.

Below is a list of dates indicating the transitions of the WWE Championship between the Raw, SmackDown, and ECW brands.

Championship belt designs

1963–1982 

When introduced in 1963, the original WWWF World Heavyweight Championship was represented by a United States championship belt that Buddy Rogers had defended sometime prior to becoming the inaugural WWWF world champion. The center plate of this belt was an outline of the continental United States and there were two shield-shaped side plates with grapplers on them; the plates were on a red leather strap. On the center plate, there was a circle flanked by grapplers, and the circle was designed to contain a photograph of the titleholder. Above the circle was a shield with an eagle atop it with stars on opposite sides of the shield. The caption "World's Champion" was added below the circle. This title belt was worn by the inaugural champion Buddy Rogers in 1963 and the second champion Bruno Sammartino. After Sammartino became champion, a new title belt on a blue strap was created. The enlarged center piece contained a crowned globe and two grapplers, and read "WWWF World Champion"; the two side plates commemorated Sammartino's title win. Sammartino wore this version for the duration of his seven-year reign. After defeating Sammartino in January 1971, Ivan Koloff held this version for three weeks before losing it to Pedro Morales.

During Morales's reign, the championship belt was updated several times. First in 1971, this design was on an indigo colored strap and contained three shield-shaped plates. Below the center plate, which read "World Heavyweight Champion" and had a cross at its center, a separate horizontal plate read "WWWF". This was replaced with another design in 1972. This version, on a red strap, read "WWWF Heavyweight Wrestling Champion" around the edges with an eagle at the center, while six side plates represented several countries. 1973 saw the introduction of another yet similar design; this one was on a black strap and contained two grapplers above a differently designed eagle. This version was subsequently held by Stan Stasiak, Bruno Sammartino, Superstar Billy Graham – who wore a red leather variation – and Bob Backlund. During the latter's reign, the promotion's name was shortened to World Wrestling Federation (WWF), but the physical championship belt still read "WWWF".

1982–2005 

A new design was introduced in January 1983, nicknamed the "Big Green Belt" due to its size and the color of its strap. It included eight (later ten) side plates dedicated to the previous champions. The center plate featured a wrestler holding up a championship belt with a globe behind him. This design, held by Bob Backlund, The Iron Sheik, and Hulk Hogan, was replaced first by the "Hogan '84" design during the Spring of 1984, then by the nearly identical "Hogan '85" design, which first appeared at WrestleMania 1. Both were called "Hogan" belts as they were only worn by Hulk Hogan. Both championship belts were similar in design to the NWA Television Championship at the time. The ‘84 belt consisted of a dual-plated gold and silver main plate as well as two dual-plated side plates on each side. The main plate was engraved with red lettering. The ‘85 belt had a silver and black main plate with raised silver lettering and the same side plates as the ‘84 belt. Both belts included black straps. Both center plates read "WWF" at the top, below that was an eagle with two banners below it reading "World Heavyweight Wrestling Champion". The bottom read "World Wrestling Federation" and above that was a name plate commemorating Hogan's title win, while the side plates noted previous champions. In October 1985, a new belt was introduced and was again only worn by Hogan. This belt is erroneously known as the “Hogan ‘86” belt. The center plate featured a globe in the center, along with Roman columns and olive branches. It read "World Heavyweight Wrestling Champion" and included the famous WWF block logo at the top, while four side plates had flags (two flags per side plate) representing the United States, Canada, Mexico, Japan, the United Kingdom, Australia, the Soviet Union, and Italy.

On February 5, 1988, just before ending his first championship reign, Hogan introduced another new design, the "Winged Eagle" championship belt, which became the primary design for the next decade with many wrestlers holding this version, and is considered the most popular design of the championship. Its nickname is derived from the eagle's wings seemingly coming off of the center plate, which included the block WWF logo and read "World Heavyweight Wrestling Champion". The championship belt also had four identical side plates. Apart from the usual black leather strap, The Ultimate Warrior wore white, light blue, yellow, and purple variations. Sgt. Slaughter continued to wear Warrior's purple strap. In March 1998, after Stone Cold Steve Austin became champion, he was presented with a new design, often dubbed the "Big Eagle" or "Attitude Era" championship belt. The center plate was similar to the previous design, but became fully rounded, and the side plates were updated. When it was unveiled, it originally contained the block WWF logo and was on a blue strap, but was updated in November 1998 to the WWF scratch logo and on a black strap. In addition to the logo, it read "World Wrestling Federation Champion".

After Chris Jericho unified the WWF and World Championships into the Undisputed WWF Championship, the "Big Eagle" championship belt was used in tandem with the "Big Gold Belt", the former WCW Championship belt, until a single Undisputed Championship belt was introduced to champion Triple H on the April 1, 2002 episode of Raw. This new belt was designed by New York-based tattoo artist Keith Ciaramello. Taking inspiration from WCW, this design included a name plate, and like the previous two designs, it had an eagle atop the globe. It originally had the WWF scratch logo and read "World Wrestling Federation Champion"; after the promotion was renamed World Wrestling Entertainment (WWE) in May 2002, both the scratch logo and wording were changed accordingly. The championship later became the WWE Championship in September 2002 when it became exclusive to SmackDown!, while the Big Gold Belt was resurrected to represent the World Heavyweight Championship for Raw.

2005–2014 

After John Cena won the WWE Championship in April 2005, he introduced his own custom belt, the "Spinner Belt", which had a gold and diamond bling-bling style reflecting his hip hop character at the time. Although originally a custom belt for Cena, it became the WWE Championship's primary design from April 12, 2005, until February 18, 2013. The scratch WWE logo, placed between an eagle on top and the word "Champ" and a name plate below, could be spun like spinner wheels or a turntable in keeping with the hip-hop theme. The inner side plates read "WWE Champion", though before 2008, one side plate indicated the brand the title was designated to. The spinning function was phased out in later years and the logo set in a fixed place, most notably during The Miz's first reign (2010–2011) when the logo was turned upside down to look like an "M".

On the February 18, 2013 episode of Raw, The Rock unveiled a new WWE Championship belt. The new title was partially designed by Orange County Choppers of American Chopper fame. 

The championship included a large cut-out of the scratch WWE logo (encrusted with diamonds) inside a large irregular heptagonal plate. The word "Champion" appeared underneath the logo in large letters. Gold divider bars separated the center plate from its two large side plates. The side plates featured a removable center section that could be customized with the champion's logo in lieu of a nameplate; the default side plates consisted of a red globe with the WWE logo on the globe underneath a crown. 

This championship belt was used in tandem with the Big Gold Belt to represent the renamed WWE World Heavyweight Championship after Randy Orton unified the WWE Championship and the World Heavyweight Championship on December 15, 2013.

2014–present 
On the August 18, 2014 episode of Raw, reigning champion Brock Lesnar, who had won the title the night before at SummerSlam, was presented with a single championship belt, retiring the Big Gold Belt in the process. The current belt has a slightly updated design from the belt introduced by The Rock in 2013 as a result of WWE changing their corporate logo which was originally used for the WWE Network. It includes a large center plate dominated by a cut out of the current WWE logo inside an irregular heptagon with the capital words "World Heavyweight Champion" along the bottom edges, in very small print. The belt retains the gold divider bars introduced in the previous design. The large side plates, like the previous design, include removable round center sections, allowing the holder's personal logo to be added to the championship belt; the default plates show gold and red world maps with the WWE logo over them but without the crown from the previous design. Customizable side plates have now become a prominent feature with the majority of WWE's championship belts.

After the 2016 brand split where the championship became exclusive to SmackDown, the similarly designed WWE Universal Championship was introduced for the Raw brand. The WWE World Heavyweight Championship subsequently reverted to being called the WWE Championship, although from July to December 2016, it was called the "WWE World Championship"; the physical belt has retained the text, "World Heavyweight Champion".

Customized designs 

Custom championship belts have been created to honor certain reigning champions or match their characters. During Hogan's reign in 1986, he had a modified version of the Hogan '86 made, which included a picture of himself at the center. This was a short lived custom design as he reverted to the Hogan '86 version. A much larger version similar to the Hogan '86 championship belt was created for André the Giant before WrestleMania III, although he never wore it as champion.

A custom championship belt was used by Stone Cold Steve Austin during his second reign (1998), which included his "Smoking Skull" logo as well as rattle snakes. As an answer, The Rock also had a custom championship belt designed and constructed, including his trademark "Brahma Bull" logo, but due to creative reasons, it never appeared on television. The Spinner Belt, originally a customized belt for John Cena, remained the standard title belt from 2005 to 2013. During Edge's second reign in 2006, he introduced his own variation, the "Rated R Spinner" design, replacing the WWE scratch logo with his "Rated R Superstar" logo. Edge was going to have a completely new custom belt designed, but due to time constraints, it did not get made. During Daniel Bryan's fourth reign (2018–2019) as part of his environmentalist heel gimmick, he threw the standard title belt in a garbage can (bemoaning the fact it was made from leather) and introduced a new custom belt, dubbed the "Planet's Championship", featuring the same design as the standard belt, but made from "entirely sustainable materials" (such as the strap being made from hemp and the center and side plates carved from wood of a naturally fallen oak tree; the side plates also had his name instead of the WWE logo).

In October 2014, WWE presented the San Francisco Giants a replica of the current WWE Championship belt for winning the 2014 World Series. This began a tradition for WWE, and they have since created custom WWE Championship belts for winners in professional sports, with the side plates commemorating the achievement. They have also presented a custom belt to exceptionally notable people for their efforts in their profession. WWE had originally presented custom WWE Championships to winners in both male and female sports, but in 2018, they began presenting those in female sports with custom WWE Raw Women's Championship belts.

Since that original gift in 2014, WWE has presented a WWE Championship belt to winners of the World Series, Super Bowl, NBA Finals, FIFA Women's World Cup, College Football Playoff National Championship, Stanley Cup Finals, Australian Open, Premier League, Bundesliga, Indian Premier League, Liga MX, Argentine Primera División, Major League Baseball Home Run Derby, Formula One World Championship, UEFA Champions League, Overwatch League, Cricket World Cup, Men's US Open, and Canadian Football League Grey Cup. WWE also presented a title to London police officer Charlie Guenigault for his "exceptional bravery" during the 2017 London Bridge attack, and to the U.S. servicemen and women who have helped in hosting WWE Tribute to the Troops (since 2015) as well as for their continued service to the country. In 2020, WWE Championship belts were also presented to Christophe Agius and Philippe Chéreau, WWE announcers in France for 20 consecutive years presenting WWE on French television.

Reigns 

The WWE Championship was the first world championship introduced into the promotion in 1963. The inaugural champion was Buddy Rogers, and there have been 54 different official champions overall and 11 vacancies. The longest reigning champion is Bruno Sammartino, who held the title from May 17, 1963, to January 18, 1971, for a total of 2,803 days (7 years, 8 months, and 1 day); Sammartino also holds the record for longest combined reign at 4,040 days. André the Giant is the shortest reigning champion, officially holding the title for 1 minute, 48 seconds. The youngest champion is Brock Lesnar, who won the title at the age of 25, while the oldest champion is Mr. McMahon, who won it at the age of 54. John Cena holds the record for most reigns with 13.

Roman Reigns is the current champion in his fourth reign. He won the title by defeating previous champion Brock Lesnar in a Winner Takes All match for both the WWE Championship and Universal Championship, which Reigns defended, on April 3, 2022, at WrestleMania 38 Night 2 in Arlington, Texas. With both championships, Reigns is referred to as the Undisputed WWE Universal Champion.

See also
 World championships in WWE

Notes

References

External links 
 Official WWE Championship Title History
 Wrestling-Titles.com: WWE Championship
 WWE Title Belts: A Guide to the Gold

World heavyweight wrestling championships
WWE championships